"Jesus' Son" is a song by the English alternative rock band Placebo. It was released as a single on 19 August 2016, and was featured in their 2016 EP Life's What You Make It as well as the band's compilation album A Place for Us to Dream later that year.

Content 

The single's cover art features Brian Molko's son, Cody, wearing an oxygen mask.

PopMatters called the song "an anthem for living life and doing it without fear".

Release and reception 

The single was released on 7" vinyl, with Placebo's cover of Talk Talk's "Life's What You Make It" as a double A-side.

PopMatters gave the single a 9/10 grade, writing: "If you're looking for a moment of spiritual comfort in a chaotic year, Placebo's your band."

Track listing

References

2016 singles
2016 songs
Placebo (band) songs
Songs written by Brian Molko
Songs written by Stefan Olsdal